Exemplaria is a quarterly peer-reviewed academic journal covering  the Middle Ages and the Early modern period. It was established in 1989 and is published by Taylor & Francis. The editors-in-chief are Anke Bernau (University of Manchester), Noah Guynn (University of California, Davis), Patricia Clare Ingham (Indiana University), and Elizabeth Scala (University of Texas at Austin). The book review editor is Robert Mills (University College London).

Reception 
In 2006 The Times Literary Supplement stated that Exemplaria "breaks into new territory, while never compromising on scholarly quality".

Abstracting and indexing 
The journal is abstracted and indexed in:

References

External links 
 

English-language journals
Taylor & Francis academic journals
Quarterly journals
Publications established in 1989